Teden Mambuene Mengi (born 30 April 2002) is an English professional footballer who plays as a centre-back for  club Manchester United.

Mengi is a graduate of the Manchester United youth system. He made his senior debut for the club in the UEFA Europa League in August 2020. He had spells on loan at Derby County in 2021 and Birmingham City in 2022. He is an England youth international and has represented the country from under-15 to under-20 level.

Club career
Mengi joined the Manchester United youth system at the age of seven. He made his first appearance for the club in an under-18 Premier League match against Sunderland on 28 October 2017. He signed his first professional contract in September 2019. He played three games for the under-21s in the 2019–20 EFL Trophy, making his debut against Lincoln City on 1 October. Soon after, he was an unused substitute for the United senior team for the first time in a Europa League match against Astana on 28 November.

Mengi made his senior debut on 5 August 2020, coming on as an 84th-minute substitute for Timothy Fosu-Mensah in a UEFA Europa League match against LASK. Mengi was promoted to the first team on 17 September ahead of the 2020–21 season, but although he was included as a substitute for EFL Cup games and on an expanded bench in the UEFA Champions League, he did not appear again for the first team in 2020.

In February 2021, he was sent on loan to EFL Championship club Derby County, managed by former United captain Wayne Rooney, for the remainder of the 2020–21 season. In March, he signed a new contract with Manchester United until June 2024, with the option of another year. After suffering an injury in April, Mengi returned to United early from Derby. Mengi joined another Championship club, Birmingham City, in January 2022 on loan for the rest of the 2021–22 season. He impressed, but a recurring hamstring injury restricted him to just ten appearances.

International career
Mengi has represented England at under-15, under-16, under-17 and under-18 levels. He was a member of the under-17 squad at the 2019 UEFA European Under-17 Championship.

In October 2021, Mengi was called up to train with the England senior team. On 11 November, Mengi made his England U20 debut during a 2–0 defeat to Portugal in the 2021–22 Under 20 Elite League.

Personal life
Mengi was born in Manchester, England, and is of Angolan descent. He attended Wright Robinson College in Gorton, Manchester.

Career statistics

References

External links

Profile at the Manchester United F.C. website

2002 births
Living people
Footballers from Manchester
English footballers
England youth international footballers
Association football defenders
Manchester United F.C. players
Derby County F.C. players
Birmingham City F.C. players
English Football League players
English people of Angolan descent
Black British sportspeople